South32 is a mining and metals company headquartered in Perth, Western Australia. It was spun out of BHP Billiton on 18 May 2015. It is listed on the Australian Securities Exchange with secondary listings on the Johannesburg and London Stock Exchanges.

Products
The company is a producer of bauxite, alumina, aluminium, metallurgical coal, manganese, nickel, copper, molybdenum, gold, silver, lead and zinc.

Operations
South32 has operations in Australia, South Africa, Mozambique, Colombia and the United States. In addition it has investments in an integrated aluminium business in Brazil and a copper and molybdenum mine in Chile.

Australia
Australia Manganese (60% shareholding); GEMCO mine on Groote Eylandt in the Northern Territory
Cannington Mine silver, lead and zinc mine, 200 km southeast of Mount Isa, Queensland
Illawarra Metallurgical Coal near Wollongong, New South Wales operates two underground metallurgical coal mines
Worsley Alumina at Worsley, Western Australia (86% owned) is a bauxite mine and alumina refinery, a portion of the alumina is exported to South32's African smelters for conversion into aluminium

Brazil
 Mineração Rio do Norte bauxite mine near Porto Trombetas (33%)
 Alumar alumina refinery (36%) and the adjoining aluminium smelter (40%) near São Luís

Chile
 Sierra Gorda copper and molybdenum mine located near Calama (45%)

Colombia
Cerro Matoso nickel mine and smelter in northern Colombia (99.94%)

Mozambique
Mozal aluminium smelter (47.1%) in Mozambique

South Africa
Hillside aluminium smelter in South Africa at Richards Bay, KwaZulu-Natal
The Wessels underground and Mamatwan opencut manganese mines at Hotazel in the Northern Cape
Metalloys smelters at Meyerton, Gauteng

United States
Hermosa, a mineral resource development option located in the Patagonia mountains of southern Arizona
Ambler Metals (50%), a mineral resource development option located in Alaska

Former operations
TEMCO, a manganese smelter located at Georgetown, Tasmania, was sold to GFG Alliance in January 2021
South Africa Energy Coal (SAEC), operating thermal coal mining assets in South Africa, was sold to Seriti in June 2021

References

Aluminium companies of Australia
BHP
Coal companies of Australia
Coal companies of South Africa
Companies based in Perth, Western Australia
Companies listed on the Australian Securities Exchange
Corporate spin-offs
Metal companies of Australia
Mining companies of Australia
Mining companies of South Africa
Nickel mining companies
Non-renewable resource companies established in 2015
Silver mining companies
Zinc mining companies
2015 establishments in Australia